Erbessa alea is a moth of the family Notodontidae first described by Herbert Druce in 1890. It is found in Ecuador.

Adults exhibit sexual dimorphism in wing pattern. The yellow forewings area is distally acute in males, but is rounded at its apex in females.

References

Moths described in 1890
Notodontidae of South America